Awheaturris is a genus of sea snails, marine gastropod mollusks in the family Raphitomidae.

Description
These species were only known from fossils in Miocene strata in the Indo-Pacific area, until Morassi & Bonfitto found a Recent species off the Philippines.

Species
Species within the genus Awheaturris include:
 † Awheaturris echinata Beu, 1970 
 † Awheaturris experta (Laws, 1947) 
 Awheaturris lozoueti Morassi & Bonfitto, 2013
 † Awheaturris pahaoensis Vella, 1954
 † Awheaturris quisquilia (Philippi, 1887)

References

External links
  Bouchet, P.; Kantor, Y. I.; Sysoev, A.; Puillandre, N. (2011). A new operational classification of the Conoidea (Gastropoda). Journal of Molluscan Studies. 77(3): 273-308
 Worldwide Mollusc Species Data Base: Raphitomidae
 

 
Raphitomidae